Hubert Henry Bennett was a professional footballer who played as a full back for Bristol Rovers. He joined the club in 1911 and played 101 games in the Southern League without scoring, before losing his place in the team to David Taylor during the 1914–15 season. He retired from professional football in 1915.

Bennett played as an emergency goalkeeper on 26 April 1913 at Coventry City when goalie Harry Stansfield had to leave the field with an injury.

Sources

Year of birth missing
1968 deaths
People from South Gloucestershire District
English footballers
Association football defenders
Bristol Rovers F.C. players
Sportspeople from Gloucestershire